Rajesh Khullar (born 31 August 1963) is an Indian diplomat and Executive Director at the World Bank Group representing India, Bangladesh, Bhutan, and Sri Lanka. Previously, he was Principal Secretary to Chief Minister, Haryana. Khullar is a 1988 batch Indian Administrative Service (IAS) officer.

Early life and education 
Khullar holds a Master of Public Administration degree from GRIPS, Tokyo, Japan and an Executive Development Program diploma from Harvard Kennedy School. He graduated from Panjab University with a Master of Science degree in Physics.

Career 
During his career as an IAS officer, Khullar has served in various capacities in both Government of India and Government of Haryana including Joint Secretary (Department of Economic Affairs, Ministry of Finance), Home Secretary (Haryana), Municipal Commissioner (Gurgaon and Faridabad) and District Magistrate (Sonipat and Rohtak).

Government of India
In February 2011, Khullar was appointed Joint Secretary, Department of Economic Affairs, Ministry of Finance. He helped formulate India’s Public Private Partnership and Land Monetization policies, developed the structure of India's infrastructure debt funds, and signed key bilateral agreements as Joint Secretary. Khullar demitted office in February 2015 following his repatriation to Haryana state cadre.

Government of Haryana
In November 2015, Khullar was appointed Principal Secretary to Chief Minister, Haryana. He also served as the Chairman of Haryana State Industrial and Infrastructure Development Corporation (HSIIDC) and Haryana Financial Corporation. In Haryana, Khullar inspired farmers to conserve water, promoted the use of digital governance tools, and designed schemes to curb female foeticide. He demitted office in October 2020 upon his appointment as Executive Director at the World Bank Group by the Appointments Committee of the Cabinet (ACC).

World Bank Group
In September 2020, Khullar was appointed Executive Director at the World Bank Group. He chairs World Bank Group's Committee on Development Effectiveness (CODE) and is a member of the Global Environment Facility council, where he represents Nepal and Maldives in addition to India, Bangladesh, Bhutan and Sri Lanka.  As Executive Director, Khullar instituted a new policy for the  Compliance Advisor Ombudsman to strengthen environmental and social accountability for the International Finance Corporation and Multilateral Investment Guarantee Agency. He also led a group of 29 countries to pledge $5.3 billion for the Global Environmental Facility to tackle climate change and biodiversity loss.

Recognition
In 2009, Khullar was conferred an Award of Excellence under Jawaharlal Nehru National Urban Renewal Mission (JNNURM) for creating India's first social safety umbrella which included savings accounts, insurance, public conveniences and night shelters.  

In 2011, Khullar was recognized for developing Aravali Biodiversity Park, Gurgaon, which was declared India’s first OECM (Other Effective Conservation Measures) site in February 2022.

In 2019, Khullar was named in Asia Post’s list of top officers in India along with Ajay Kumar Bhalla, Home Secretary (India) and Ajay Kumar, Defence Secretary (India) who "have created new benchmarks of performance in public service."

Works 

 Viral Match (2008) ISBN 9788129112835
 Civil Services General Studies Main Examination - A Strategic Approach (2004) ISBN 8190214802

References

External links 

Indian Administrative Service officers
Indian diplomats

Panjab University alumni

1963 births
Living people